Brooke Allison is the debut and only to date studio album by American pop singer Brooke Allison, released on June 19, 2001. The album includes songs written by Mýa, Meredith Brooks and Allan Rich. Allison appeared on a number of TV programs to promote it, including Nickelodeon's Slime Time Live. The music video of "The Kiss-Off (Goodbye)", was often the Nick Video Pick of the Day, also on Nickelodeon.

The album failed to chart on any major charts and was also negatively received by critics. Consequently promotion for the album was interrupted and Allison was dropped in mid-2002. "The Kiss-Off (Goodbye)" was the only single and reached number 28 on the Billboard Hot 100 Sales chart when a CD single was issued,.

She has not released any further solo material, but went on to become a member of the girl group BG5, who released several singles before disbanding.

Composition 
Allison has said of the album: "It's so crazy - in a good way - because the album has so many musical styles... I mean, we've got some pop, R&B and ballads, but my main style is probably pop Top 40."

Track listing 
"The Kiss-Off (Goodbye)" (Jim Peterik, Jeff Jacobs) – 3:31
"Oh No" (Interlude) – 0:07
"Toodle-Oo" (Peter Rafelson, Jeff Vincent) – 3:36
"I Miss You" (Larry Dvoskin, Meredith Brooks) – 4:07
"Seth" (Interlude) – 0:21
"Rollercoaster" (Robert Palmer, Kasia Livingston, Jeff Vincent) – 3:28
"Thought You Might Wanna Know" (Robert Palmer, Kasia Livingston) – 3:57
"If I Were You" (James Day, Amy Powers, Jim Gatley) – 4:12
"Perfect Chemistry" (Mýa Harrison, Damon Elliott, Michael Blakey) – 3:01
"Without You" (Vincent Brantley) – 3:24
"Maybe Tonight" (Erik Trent Andrews) – 4:01
"Dating" (Interlude) – 0:14
"My Heart Goes Boom" (Greg Wood, Geoman) – 3:10
"Say Goodbye" (Mark Portmann, Allan Rich, Serge Colbert) – 4:17

"The Kiss-Off (Goodbye)" contains a sample of "Goodbye" as performed by Elwood Edwards, courtesy of America Online.

 The closing track, "Say Goodbye", was featured on the hit but short-lived Nickelodeon television series, Taina, in the season two episode, Sabotage, which Allison herself also guest starred in. An instrumental snippet can also be heard in the episode.

Personnel

Elton Ahi – production, mixing, strings, piano
Agostina – make-up
Brooke Allison – lead and background vocals
Michael Argento – spoken vocals on interludes
Michael Blakey – production, mixing, drum programming, percussion, strings, executive producer
Chelsea Brummet – spoken vocals on interludes
David Campbell – strings
Scott Canady – bass guitar
Frank Chevalier – stylist
Cario Dalla Chiesa – photography
Yong-Bae Cho – engineering
Serge Colbert – strings
Demetric Collins – guitars, percussion
Claudio Cueni – mixing
Jim Davis – assistant engineer 
Elwood Edwards – sample vocals
Damon Elliott – production, programming
Mary Fagot – creative direction
Craig Furkas – engineer
Grant Geissman – acoustic guitar
Bruce Gladstone – executive producer
Van Gogh – production
Jesse Gorman – assistant engineer
Julie Griffin – background vocals
Portia Griffin – background vocals

John Guidon – executive producer
David Guerrero – assistant engineer
Tim Heintz – keyboards
Kent Huffnagle – assistant engineer
Charles Jefferson – bass guitar
Denaine Jones – background vocals
Aaron Kaplan – assistant engineer
Tim Malone – mix engineer
Matt Marrin – assistant engineer
Ethan Mates – mixing
Will Miller – strings
Fred Mirza – arrangement
Tim Neuman – creative direction
Robert Palmer – production, guitars, keyboards
Dave Pensada – mix engineer
Mark Portmann – production, strings
Ian Prince – keyboards
Serena Radaelli – hair
Peter Rafelson – production, mixing, engineering
Eric Roinestad – art direction, design
Christophe Saluzzo – hair
Eddy Schreyer – mastering
Jill Tengan – assistant engineer 
Michael Thompson – guitars
Jeff Vincent – production, keyboards

References

Brooke Allison albums
2001 debut albums